Hazelbaker is a surname. It may refer to:

Frank A. Hazelbaker (1878–1939), American politician in Montana who served as Lieutenant Governor of Montana
Frank W. Hazelbaker (1912–1990), American politician in the state of Montana
Jeremy Hazelbaker (born 1987), American baseball outfielder
Jill Hazelbaker, American communications executive, political campaign activist primarily for candidates of the U.S. Republican Party